Lord Douglas may refer to:

 Marquess of Douglas, created 1633 in the Peerage of Scotland, now a subsidiary title of the Duke of Hamilton
 Earl of Douglas, created 1356/7 in the Peerage of Scotland, forfeit in 1455
 Lord Douglas, created 1475/6 in the Peerage of Scotland, a subsidiary title held by Archibald Douglas, 5th Earl of Angus
 Lord Douglas of Hawick and Tibberis, created 1628 in Peerage of Scotland, subsidiary title of the Marquess of Queensberry
 Lord Douglas of Ettrick, created 1675 in the Peerage of Scotland as a subsidiary title of the Earl of Dumbarton
 Lord Douglas of Kinmont, Midlebie and Dornock, created 1684 in Peerage of Scotland, subsidiary title of the Duke of Buccleuch
 Lord Douglas of Neidpath, Lyne and Munard, created 1697 in Peerage of Scotland as subsidiary title for the Earl of March
 Lord Douglas, of Bonkill, Prestoun & Robertoun, created 1703 Peerage of Scotland as subsidiary title of the Duke of Douglas
 Lord Douglas of Lockerbie, Dalveen and Thornhill, created 1706 in the Peerage of Scotland as a subsidiary for the Earl of Solway, subsequently 2nd Duke of Dover
 Baron Douglas of Amesbury, Co. Wilts, created 1786 in the Peerage of Great Britain, a subsidiary title held by William Douglas, 4th Duke of Queensberry
 Baron Douglas, of Amesbury, Co. Wilts, created 1786 in the Peerage of Great Britain, a subsidiary title held by William Douglas, 4th Duke of Queensberry
 Baron Douglas of Douglas, Co. Lanark, created 1790 in the Peerage of Great Britain for Archibald Douglas, 1st Baron Douglas
 Baron Douglas of Lochleven, created 1791 for George Douglas, 16th Earl of Morton
 Baron Douglas, of Douglas, created 1875 in the Peerage of the United Kingdom for the 11th Earl of Home
 Baron Douglas of Baads, created 1911 in the Peerage of the United Kingdom as a subsidiary title for the Viscount Chilston
 Baron Douglas of Kirtleside, created 1948
 Baron Douglas of Barloch, created 1950 in the Peerage of the United Kingdom

See also
 Baron Douglas (disambiguation)